Enriched text is a formatted text format for e-mail, defined by the IETF in RFC 1896 and associated with the text/enriched MIME type which is defined in RFC 1563. It is "intended to facilitate the wider interoperation of simple enriched text across a wide variety of hardware and software platforms". As of 2012, enriched text remained almost unknown in e-mail traffic, while HTML e-mail is widely used. Enriched text, or at least the subset of HTML that can be transformed into enriched text, is seen as preferable to full HTML for use with e-mail (mainly because of security considerations).

A predecessor of this MIME type was called text/richtext in RFC 1341 and RFC 1521. Neither should  be confused with Rich Text Format (MIME type text/rtf or application/rtf) which are unrelated specifications, devised by Microsoft.

A single newline in enriched text is treated as a space. Formatting commands are in the same style as SGML and HTML. They must be balanced and nested.

Enriched text is a supported format of Emacs, Mutt, Mulberry and Netscape Communicator.

Examples

References

External links
The text/enriched MIME Content-type

Email
Internet Standards
Computer file formats
Markup languages